The 2012 Munster Senior Football Championship was that year's installment of the annual Munster Senior Football Championship held under the auspices of the Munster GAA. It was won by Cork who defeated Clare in the final. It was Cork's 37th title. This was Clare's first appearance in the final since 2000.

The winning Cork team received the Munster Championship Cup, and automatically advanced to the quarter-final stage of the 2012 All-Ireland Senior Football Championship. Clare entered the All-Ireland Qualifiers but lost their next game, to Kerry. Cork were eliminated by eventual All-Ireland winners Donegal.

Bracket

Quarter-finals

Semi-finals

Final

References

External links
Munster GAA website

2M
Munster Senior Football Championship